T.T. Ross was a British lovers rock singer best known for her 1970s singles "Last Date" and "Imagine".

After beginning to record in the mid-1970s, including singles recorded as duets with Gene Rondo, Ross first found success on the British reggae charts in 1975 with "Last Date", produced by Dennis Harris and released on the Lucky label, one of the early releases in the lovers rock genre. The single was later licensed to Polydor Records. She had further success with a cover version of John Lennon's "Imagine" in 1978. One of few white singers in the genre at the time, she was known as 'The White Lady of Reggae'. She continued to record into the early 1980s.

Discography

Albums
T.T. Ross and Friends (1976), Third World
Showcase Vol. 1, Lover's Rock (LR005)
Mellow Mood (1980), Three Kings

Compilations
Say You Wanna Be Loved (1997), Creole/Rhino

Singles
"When Will I See You Again" (1974/5), Dip
"Little Things Mean a Lot" (1975), Dip - Gene Rondo & T.T. Ross
"Miss Grace" (1975), Wild Flower - Gene Rondo & T.T. Ross
"Last Date" (1975), Lucky - also issued on Polydor Records
"I am Sorry" (1975), Polydor
"No Charge" (1975), Lucky
"Single Girl" (1975), Dip
"Baby Why" (1976), Lucky
"Misty Blue" (1976), Lucky
"Let the World Go Away" (1976), House of Eve
"Taxation" (1976), Junior
"Jealousy" (1977), Lucky
"I Will" (1977), Lover's Rock
"Imagine" (1978), Lover's Rock
"No Charge" (1978), Lover's Rock (12")
"Won't Mention It Again" (1978), Love Bird
"Tonight Is the Night" (1978), Love Bird - Cassandra & T.T. Ross
"He's Mine", Dione
"Romeo" (1982), Love, Peace & Unity
"When I Was a Little Girl" (2012), Attack

References

Lovers rock musicians
British reggae musicians
English women singers
Polydor Records artists